Shadows is a novel written by British author Tim Bowler and was first published in 1999. The Young Telegraph described the novel as having 'lots of pace, action and a couple of shocking twists!' It tells the story of Jamie, a 16-year-old living in Ashingford who used to enjoy playing squash. It is revealed in the book that he stopped liking the sport after his family moved to Ashingford.
 
Jamie is under pressure from his father to succeed. In the competitive world of squash, his dad is determined that Jamie should succeed where he failed. The emotional and physical bullying that Jamie has to endure makes him recoil into himself until he feels backed into a corner and doesn't know where to turn.

But Jamie doesn't share his father's single-minded ambition and is desperate to escape from the verbal and physical abuse that follows when he fails. Then Jamie finds the girl hiding in his shed, and in helping her to escape from her past and the danger that is pursuing her, he is able to put his own problems in perspective and realize that he must come out of the shadows and face up to his father.

Awards
 2000 Angus Book Award
 2000 Lancashire Children's Book of the Year Award

References

External links
Tim Bowler

1999 British novels
British young adult novels
Novels by Tim Bowler
Novels about bullying
Oxford University Press books